Patsoi is a tehsil (sub-district) in the Imphal West District of Manipur. The census code of Patsoi block is 01880. There are about 25 villages in Patsoi block, including the Patsoi village.

List of villages in Patsoi

 Awang Jiri
 Changangei
 Ghari
 Heigrujam
 Khaidem
 Khumbong
 Konthoujam
 Lamjaotongba
 Langjing
 Langjing Achouba
 Lanshonbi
 Leingangpokpi
 Maha Koireng
 Manamyang
 Meisnam Kangmong
 Moidangpok Khullen
 Moidangpok Khunou
 Patsoi (village includes Patsoi part 1 to 4)
 Sajirok
 Sangaiprou Maning
 Taobungkhok
 Top Khabi
 Yarou Bamdiar
 Yarou Meitram
 Yurembam

Polling stations 

The polling stations in Patsoi legislative constituency include:

The MLAs include:

 2002: Moirangthem Nabadwip (Communist Party of India)
 2007: Sapam Kunjakeswor Singh (Independent)
 2012: Akoijam Mirabai Devi (Indian National Congress)

References

Villages in Imphal West district